The Kayah State Cultural Museum is a museum that display bronze drums used in wedding and funeral occasions, stone beads, household utensils, traditional looms, traditional dresses, silverware, weapons, paintings and musical instruments of the Kayah people and located in Loikaw, Kayah State in Burma. The museum holds nearly 13000 books and 405 individual objects.

It was established on September 18, 1996.

References

Museums in Myanmar
Kayah State
Museums established in 1996